The United States has an embassy in Copenhagen and a consulate in Nuuk, Greenland. Both countries are members of the Arctic Council, OECD, OSCE, NATO and the United Nations.

History

Diplomatic relations date back to 1783, when Denmark signed a commercial treaty with the United States. In 1792, Denmark recognized the independence of the United States. In 1801, diplomatic relations were established, and an American legation was opened in Denmark. The diplomatic relations have never experienced an interruption, since 1801.

In 1801, Denmark became an ally of France and its war against Great Britain, and the Danish Navy seized American merchant ships. A treaty of commerce was signed in 1826, and Denmark agreed to pay the United States an indemnity of $650,000. During the American Civil War, Washington proposed to purchase the Danish West Indies to better maintain its blockade of the Confederacy. The United States Senate refused to go along, and negotiations continued intermittently for five more decades, but both sides had internal opposition.

World War I

Denmark was neutral in World War I, but suffered a significant disruption in trade, and decided its colonies were a financial burden, especially as the inhabitants were restive. The United States did not want Germany to purchase the islands of Saint Thomas, Saint Croix, and Saint John. In 1916, Denmark sold their Danish West Indies to the United States, and both countries signed the Treaty of the Danish West Indies. The sale for $25 million deal was finalized on 17 January 1917. On 31 March 1917, the United States took possession of the islands and the territory was renamed the Virgin Islands of the United States.

World War II
During World War II, in April 1941, the United States worked with Henrik Kauffmann Denmark's ambassador to Washington to establish a temporary protectorate over Greenland.

Rejecting Denmark's long history of neutrality, it joined NATO as a founding member in 1949. The country remains a member but there has always been a strong anti-NATO element in left-wing Danish circles. In December 1995, Danish troops deployed to Bosnia and Herzegovina as part of the United Nations peacekeeping force were assigned to the American sector, coming under direct American command.

Political relations

Denmark is a close NATO ally, and relations are described as "excellent". Denmark is active in Afghanistan and Kosovo as well as a leader in the Baltic region. Former Danish Prime Minister Anders Fogh Rasmussen reaffirmed that Denmark would remain engaged in Iraq even as its troop levels declined. Denmark was the only Scandinavian country to approve of the American Invasion of Iraq, and Denmark and the United States consult closely on European political and security matters. Denmark shares U.S. views on the positive ramifications of NATO enlargement. Denmark is an active coalition partner in the war on terrorism, and Danish troops are supporting American-led stabilization efforts in Afghanistan and Iraq. The United States also engages Denmark in a broad cooperative agenda through the Enhanced Partnership in Northern Europe; The U.S. policy structure to strengthen U.S.-Nordic-Baltic policy and program coordination.

Trade
Denmark's active liberal trade policy in the European Union, Organisation for Economic Co-operation and Development, and World Trade Organization largely coincides with U.S. interests. The U.S. is Denmark's largest non-European trade partner with about 5% of Danish merchandise trade. Denmark's role in European environmental and agricultural issues and its strategic location at the entrance to the Baltic Sea have made Copenhagen a center for U.S. agencies and the private sector dealing with the Nordic/Baltic region.

Greenland

Shortly before the purchase of Alaska from the Russian Empire, United States Secretary of State William H. Seward attempted to buy both Greenland and Iceland from Denmark, but was unsuccessful.

Following World War II, the United States developed a geopolitical interest in Greenland, and in 1946, the United States offered to buy Greenland from Denmark for $100,000,000, but Denmark refused to sell.

Thule Air Base, the U.S. Air Force base and early warning radar at Thule, Greenland, a Danish self-governing territory serve as a vital link in western defenses. In August 2004, the Danish and Greenland Home Rule governments gave permission for the early warning radar to be updated in connection with a role in the U.S. ballistic missile defense system. At the same time, agreements were signed to enhance economic, technical, and environmental cooperation between the United States and Greenland.

On 10 June 2020, the United States reopened its consulate in Nuuk, Greenland. The first U.S. consulate in Nuuk closed in 1953.

1968 Thule Air Base B-52 crash

The 1968 Thule Air Base B-52 crash was an accident on 21 January 1968, involving a United States Air Force B-52 bomber. The aircraft was carrying four hydrogen bombs on a Cold War "Chrome Dome" alert mission over Baffin Bay when a cabin fire forced the crew to abandon the aircraft before they could carry out an emergency landing at Thule Air Base. Six crew members ejected safely, but one who did not have an ejection seat was killed while trying to bail out. The bomber crashed onto sea ice in North Star Bay, Greenland, causing the nuclear payload to rupture and disperse, which resulted in widespread radioactive contamination. The United States and Denmark launched an intensive clean-up and recovery operation, but the secondary of one of the nuclear weapons could not be accounted for after the operation completed.

Proposed purchase by the United States in 2019

In 2019, President Donald Trump discussed the idea of purchasing Greenland with senior advisers. Numerous Greenlandic and Danish politicians, including the Premier of Greenland and the Prime Minister of Denmark, rebuffed the idea, saying that the island is not for sale. A few days later, Trump abruptly postponed a planned state visit to Denmark just days before, citing their unwillingness to discuss his proposal of buying Greenland.

State visits

In 1967, Princess Margrethe and Prince Henrik visited the United States.

Former President Bill Clinton visited Denmark in 1997, and again in 2007. American President George W. Bush made an official visit to Copenhagen in July 2005, and Danish Prime Minister Anders Fogh Rasmussen met with Bush at Camp David in June 2006.

Former President Barack Obama and former First Lady Michelle Obama traveled to Denmark to support the Chicago bid for the 2016 Summer Olympics in October 2009, and in December 2009, Obama visited Denmark again for the 2009 United Nations Climate Change Conference. In March 2009, former Danish Foreign Minister Lene Espersen met former Secretary of State Hillary Clinton in the Gaza Donor Conference, and again in a NATO meeting in April 2010, where they met in Estonia.

In March 2009, Crown Prince Frederik and Princess Mary visited the Midwest. They visited The Danish Home in Chicago, and the Danish villages of Elk Horn, Ames, Kimballton and the Grand View University in Iowa. In Nebraska, the couple visited Dana College. "States like Iowa and Nebraska boast numerous examples of Danish settlements ... Both universities have made great strides to become highly recognized institutions of higher learning, as well as strengthening ties between Denmark and the United States", Crown Prince Frederik said.

On 9 March 2011, Obama met with former Danish Prime Minister Lars Løkke Rasmussen in the White House, where they discussed counter-terrorism, the Arab Spring and environmental issues.

On 30 March 2017, Rasmussen visited President Donald Trump in the United States. Discussion points were the state of the bilateral relations as well as counter-terrorism, economic opportunities, and NATO.

On 20 August 2019, President Donald Trump abruptly postponed a state visit to Denmark just days before after the Danish Prime Minister Mette Frederiksen had declined Trump's offer to buy Greenland, saying that the island is not for sale.

See also

 List of ambassadors of Denmark to the United States
 List of ambassadors of the United States to Denmark
 Danish Americans

References

Further reading
 Banka, Andris. "Neither reckless nor free-riders: auditing the Baltics as US treaty allies." Journal of Transatlantic Studies (2022): 1-23. online
 Fogdall, Soren, Danish-American diplomacy, 1776-1920 (1922) Online
 Henriksen, Anders, and Jens Ringsmose. "What did Denmark gain? Iraq, Afghanistan and the relationship with Washington." Danish foreign policy yearbook 2012 (2012): 157-81. online
 Jakobsen, Peter Viggo, Jens Ringsmose, and Håkon Lunde Saxi. "Prestige-seeking small states: Danish and Norwegian military contributions to US-led operations." European journal of international security 3.2 (2018): 256-277.
 Jakobsen, Peter Viggo, and Jens Ringsmose. "Size and reputation—why the USA has valued its ‘special relationships’ with Denmark and the UK differently since 9/11." Journal of Transatlantic Studies 13.2 (2015): 135-153. online
 Kaarbo, Juliet, and Cristian Cantir. "Role conflict in recent wars: Danish and Dutch debates over Iraq and Afghanistan." Cooperation and Conflict 48.4 (2013): 465-483.
 Kronvall, Olof.  "US–Scandinavian Relations Since 1940". in the Oxford Research Encyclopedia of Politics. Oxford University Press, 2020.
 Lidegaard, Bo.  Defiant Diplomacy: Henrik Kauffmann, Denmark, and the United States in World War II and the Cold War, 1939-1958. Peter Lang, 2003. . online
 McNamara, Eoin M., and Mari-Liis Sulg. "The Baltic states in NATO: An evolving transatlantic bargain from newcomers to President Trump." in NATO and Transatlantic Relations in the 21st Century (Routledge, 2020) pp. 142-166.
 Petersen, Nikolaj. "Denmark and NATO 1948-1987." (1987). online
 Rytkønen, Helle. "Drawing the line: The cartoons controversy in Denmark and the US." Danish foreign policy yearbook (2007): 86-109. online
 Wivel, Anders, and Matthew Crandall. "Punching above their weight, but why? Explaining Denmark and Estonia in the transatlantic relationship." Journal of transatlantic studies 17.3 (2019): 392-419. online

External links

 
Bilateral relations of the United States
United States
Foreign relations of Greenland